Caroline Gillmer (born 1955) is an Australian actress, best known for her roles in  various television series, such as  Prisoner as Helen Smart and Neighbours as Cheryl Stark. During her time off sick from Neighbours, Gillmer was temporarily replaced by fellow ex-Prisoner cast member Colette Mann who played Doreen Burns, and who later played Sheila Canning.

Gillmer has had many guest roles in television series including a recurring guest role on MDA and supporting roles in TV shows such as Bed of Roses. She  portrayed Judy Moran in the hit TV series Underbelly.

Filmography

Film

Television

External links

Australian film actresses
Australian soap opera actresses
1955 births
Living people
20th-century Australian actresses
21st-century Australian actresses